Chung Nguyen Do (Bulgarian: Чунг Нгуен До; born 23 May 2005) is a Bulgarian footballer who plays as a midfielder for Slavia Sofia.

Career
Born in Sofia to parents from Vietnam, Chung started his career at age of 6 in CSKA Sofia academy, before moving to Slavia Sofia. Starting as a goalkeeper, he switched to midfielder because he wanted to enjoy the game more. In the summer of 2022, it was reported that Barcelona are interested in Nguyen Do. In January 2023 he was promoted to the first team and joined the winter camp. Chung completed his professional debut in a league match against Pirin Blagoevgrad on 13 January 2023.

International career
Nguyen Do holds dual citizenship making him available for both Bulgaria and Vietnam. He was called up for Bulgaria U17 in 2021 and helped the team to qualify to the European U17 Championship. Chung was in the squad for the 2022 UEFA European Under-17 Championship. In September 2022 he was called up for Bulgaria U19 for the 2023 UEFA European Under-19 Championship qualification matches.

On 18 March 2023, he received his first call-up for the Bulgaria U21 for the friendly tournament Antalya Cup between 25 and 28 March 2023.

Career statistics

Club

References

External links
 

2005 births
Living people
Bulgarian footballers
Bulgaria youth international footballers
PFC Slavia Sofia players
First Professional Football League (Bulgaria) players
Association football midfielders
Bulgarian people of Vietnamese descent